Temnora pseudopylas is a moth of the family Sphingidae. It is very common in eastern and southern Africa, but absent in very dry habitats.

The length of the forewings is 20–22 mm and the wingspan is 42–49 mm. It is very similar to Temnora pylas pylas, but slightly larger, the forewings and body are reddish brown to dark purplish brown. The margin of the wings are more deeply indented. The markings of the forewings are heavier and more distinct. The dark margin of the hindwing is dark brown and better defined and the underside is variegated with ochreous yellow and orange brown. The abdominal
tufts of the male are dull reddish brown.

The larvae feed on Pentas bussei.

Subspecies
Temnora pseudopylas pseudopylas
Temnora pseudopylas latimargo Rothschild & Jordan, 1903 (Comoro Islands)
Temnora pseudopylas leptis Rothschild & Jordan, 1903 (Sierra Leone)

References

Temnora
Moths described in 1894
Moths of the Comoros
Moths of Africa